The Captain's Houses are a row of four nearly identical houses built along Corsica Creek in Centreville, Maryland after the Civil War. The houses are built on raised brick foundations into a small bluff along the creek, allowing access to the main level from the top of the bluff.  The upper levels of the houses are framed construction.

The houses were listed on the National Register of Historic Places in 1988.

References

External links

Houses completed in 1878
Houses in Queen Anne's County, Maryland
Houses on the National Register of Historic Places in Maryland
National Register of Historic Places in Queen Anne's County, Maryland